A series of four mainshocks struck Calabria on March 27–28 and June 9, 1638. The first three earthquakes had moment magnitudes estimated to be  6.6–7.1. On June 9, another mainshock estimated at  6.7 struck the same region, causing further damage and casualties. The four earthquakes resulted in as many as 30,000 fatalities.

Tectonic setting

The region of Calabria is located between the Tyrrhenian and Ionian Seas, where active extension is ongoing. Extension is accommodated by normal faults on the Tyrrhenian side in Calabria. The trend of normal faults extend southwards to the Strait of Messina, where they occur on the Ionian side in Sicily. Known as the Siculo–Calabrian rift, this active geological feature is characterized by its high seismicity of earthquakes up to  7.1.

Geology
The earthquake of March 27 occurred within the Crati Valley fault system, specifically on the Piano Lago and Savuto–Decollatura faults. The March 28 earthquakes ruptured the Mesima fault system and Santa Eufemia–Feroleto fault. The Lake Fault, which produced a surface rupture, was responsible for the June 9 earthquake, based on rich historical documentation and paleoseismology. This normal fault dips at an angle to the west and offsets the surface vertically. Two slightly weaker earthquakes struck the same region in 1832 and 1836.

Summary of events
Based on analysis of the first-hand documentation, historiography and literary works during the 17th century, three mainshocks were identified: one on March 27 and two on March 28.

Earthquake sequence

March 27
At 10:00 p.m., the first and most destructive earthquake struck with an epicenter in the Savuto Valle or near the upper Crati River. It reached a maximum Modified Mercalli intensity level of XI (Extreme) in the heavily populated communes of Martirano, Rogliano, Santo Stefano di Rogliano, Grimaldi, Motta Santa Lucia, Marzi and Carpanzano. The earthquake destroyed much of the settlements in those towns. The town of Amantea suffered total damage, while minor damage was reported at Maratea and Reggio Calabria. According to Ettore Capecelatro, a jurist and official of the Kingdom of Naples, more than 10,000 homes were destroyed, while another 3,000 were rendered unsafe for habitation. Luca Cellesi, the bishop of the Roman Catholic Diocese of Martirano, was injured during the collapse of his castle in the town of Pedivigliano, where he reported that the population of his diocese fell from 12,000 to 6,500 after the quake. In Aiello Calabro, 408 homes were obliterated and 655 residents were killed. At least 116 inhabitants were killed in Belsito, 234 in Grimaldi, 495 in Carpanzano, 229 in Conflenti, 173 in Malito, 532 in Motta Sta Lucia, 1,200 in Nicastro, 102 in Piane Crati, 216 in Sambiase, 451 in Scigliano Diano and 126 in Feroleto. The town of Martirano was destroyed and 517 inhabitants were killed.

Following the earthquake, the affected areas saw a decrease in population from migration. Many inhabitants of Motta Santa Lucia moved to Decollatura, and residents of Pedivigliano and Pittarella moved to Sila. Survivors from Scigliano and Carpanzano relocated to the Ionian coast and formed the communes of Mandatoriccio and Savelli.

March 28
The two earthquakes on March 28 occurred in the southern tip of Calabria on Palm Sunday. One of the two shocks' epicenters was near Nicastro, where 3,000 people were killed. At least 600 of the total deaths in the city resulted from the collapse of a church. Many more residents were killed in Lamezia Terme, Falerna, Feroleto Antico and Sant'Eufemia Lamezia. The quake caused a destructive tsunami in the Gulf of Saint Euphemia. Damage at Sant'Eufemia Lamezia was so severe that the town was abandoned.

A second shock occurred in the Serre Calabresi, causing fissures to appear in the ground. Sulfur and flames were reported emanating from the newly formed fissures. The earthquake was particularly destructive in Rosarno and Mileto, while the town centers of Borrello, Briatico and Castelmonardo was destroyed.

June 9
The June 9 nighttime earthquake registered a magnitude of 6.7 and a maximum Mercalli intensity of X. It affected the region of Sila, where six villages were destroyed. Extreme damage was reported in Catanzaro and Crotone, as well as in 13 other villages. The earthquake caused a large surface-fault rupture measuring 96.6 km long and 0.8-meters tall. The fault rupture was visible, extending from Petilia Policastro to Sila, near the eastern shore of Ampollino Lake.

The earthquake was preceded by two strong foreshocks in the early morning and afternoon, alerting many residents to stay outdoors. Despite the severity of damage, only 52 people were killed.

See also
 List of earthquakes in Italy
 List of historical earthquakes

Notes

Citations

Sources 

Earthquakes in Italy
1638 in Italy
History of Naples
Tsunamis in Italy
17th century in Italy
Earthquake clusters, swarms, and sequences
History of Calabria
History of Abruzzo
Crotone
Lamezia Terme
Catanzaro
Province of Cosenza
Kingdom of Sicily
1638 earthquakes